Stadionul Viitorul is a multi-purpose stadium in Ovidiu, Romania. It is currently used mostly for football matches and is the home ground of Farul Constanța. Before 2021, the stadium was the home ground of Viitorul Constanța. The stadium holds 4,554 people.

Events

Association football

Association football

References

Ovidiu
Football venues in Romania
Buildings and structures in Constanța County
Multi-purpose stadiums in Romania